The South Street Bridge is a historic Pratt truss bridge, carrying Vermont Route 31 across the Poultney River just south of the village center of Poultney, Vermont.  Built in 1923, it is one of a small number of surviving Pratt through trusses in the state, and one of just three that survives from the period before the state's devastating 1927 floods.  It was listed on the National Register of Historic Places in 2009 as Bridge 4.

Description and history
Vermont Route 31 is the major roadway leading south from the village of Poultney in western Vermont. Starting as Grove Street in the village center, it crosses the Poultney River on this bridge, and is known in the southern portion as South Street. The bridge is oriented north-south, and the river flows roughly westward, eventually forming the state line with neighboring New York before emptying into Lake Champlain.

The bridge was designed in 1922 by Frank Garran, a state engineer, to conform to standards enacted by the state in 1921, and was completed in 1923.  Its trusses were fabricated by the Palmer Steel Company of Holyoke, Massachusetts.  The bridge was paid for by state and local funds.  At the time of its construction, most state-funded bridges were still built as concrete deck bridges, and the use of trusses was still a developing strategy, which would be greatly accelerated by the massive flooding the state experienced in 1927.

See also
National Register of Historic Places listings in Rutland County, Vermont
List of bridges on the National Register of Historic Places in Vermont

References

Road bridges on the National Register of Historic Places in Vermont
Bridges completed in 1923
Bridges in Rutland County, Vermont
Buildings and structures in Poultney, Vermont
National Register of Historic Places in Rutland County, Vermont
Steel bridges in the United States
Truss bridges in the United States